Las Vegas Post Office and Courthouse is a Neo-classical building located in Downtown Las Vegas, Nevada. It is listed on the United States National Register of Historic Places.

History 
The building was erected between 1931 and 1933, opening on November 27, 1933. It served as a post office, and as a court house of the United States District Court for the District of Nevada.

The building was listed in the National Register of Historic Places on February 10, 1983.  The building remained an active post office for several more years.

Control of the building was turned over to the city in 2002 for use as a museum and cultural center.

Mob Museum 

The building was restored and renovated into the National Museum of Organized Crime and Law Enforcement in February 2012.

Sources 
Historic Federal Building web site

References

External links 

Las Vegas Downtown Post Office (from the UNLV Architecture Studies Library)

Buildings and structures in Las Vegas
Downtown Las Vegas
Courthouses in Nevada
Post office buildings in Nevada
History of Las Vegas
Government buildings completed in 1933
National Register of Historic Places in Las Vegas
Post office buildings on the National Register of Historic Places in Nevada
Ely
Nevada State Register of Historic Places
Historic American Buildings Survey in Nevada
Neoclassical architecture in Nevada
1933 establishments in Nevada